Earl Watson (born September 14, 1990) is an American professional basketball player who last played for Legia Warszawa of the Polish Basketball League. Standing at 2.01 m (6'7"), he plays both the power forward and the center positions. After two years at Chipola Junior College and two years at Rhode Island Watson entered the 2016 NBA draft but was not selected in the draft's two rounds.

High school career
Watson played high school basketball at Fort Pierce Central at Fort Pierce, Florida and at Queen City Prep Academy, at Charlotte, North Carolina.

College career
After graduating from high school, Watson was originally inked a National Letter of Intent to attend Wichita State. In the end, he attended Chipola Junior College, where he stayed until 2013. As a freshman with the Indians, Watson averaged 6.5 points and 5.3 rebounds while making 57% of his field goal attempts. During the 2012-13 season, he averaged 9.5 points, 6.4 rebounds, and 1.0 blocks, connecting on 54.0% of his shots from the floor. The next two years, Watson played with the Rhode Island. As a senior, he averaged 5.5 points, 5.2 rebounds and 1 block per game, in 32 games with the Rams.

Professional career
After going undrafted in the 2016 NBA draft, Watson signed with Kolossos Rodou of the Greek Basket League. After his spell with Kolossos, he joined Capitol Montevideo of the Uruguayan League.

On July 31, 2017, Watson joined SCM CSU Craiova of the Romanian League. On November 23, 2017, he left Craiova and joined IRT Tanger in the Nationale 1. On August 26, 2018, Watson signed with Río Ourense Termal of the LEB Oro.

On June 25, 2020, he has signed with Legia Warszawa of the Polish Basketball League.

References

External links
RealGM.com Profile
Eurobasket.com Profile
Rhode Island Rams bio

1990 births
Living people
American expatriate basketball people in Greece
American expatriate basketball people in Morocco
American expatriate basketball people in Romania
American expatriate basketball people in Spain
American expatriate basketball people in Uruguay
American men's basketball players
Basketball players from Florida
Centers (basketball)
Chipola Indians men's basketball players
Club Ourense Baloncesto players
Fundación CB Granada players
Kolossos Rodou B.C. players
Legia Warsaw (basketball) players
People from Fort Pierce, Florida
Power forwards (basketball)
Rhode Island Rams men's basketball players
SCM U Craiova (basketball) players